Count Otto II of Nassau-Siegen ( – between 6 December 1350 and 25 January 1351), was since 1343 Count of Nassau-Siegen (a part of the County of Nassau). He descended from the Ottonian Line of the House of Nassau.

Biography
Otto was born  as the eldest son of Count Henry I of Nassau-Siegen and Lady .

In 1336, Otto and his younger brother Henry concluded a provisional division treaty for their father’s county. However, Henry's marriage in 1339 led to conflict between the two brothers. Otto even forged an alliance with Landgrave  against Henry in 1340. A new division treaty followed on 18 June 1341, which assigned to Otto the Siegerland, the Mark Herborn with Dillenburg and the district of Haiger, as well as Löhnberg.

Otto succeeded his father in July or August 1343. The following year, Otto sold castle and lordship of Löhnberg to Count palatine Rupert I and Count Gerlach I of Nassau. On 20 September of that same year, Otto was granted city privileges for Dillenburg by Holy Roman Emperor Louis ‘the Bavarian’.

Otto is not considered to have been a good regent. His short reign was a succession of feuds during which the country was devastated and the sources of prosperity were blocked. To control his expenses, he was forced to pledge possessions frequently and as a result the development of a powerful activity inwardly as well as outwardly was hampered. He was forced to sell the Nassau half of the city of Siegen to the Electorate of Cologne and lost all parts of the  that Nassau had acquired to the County of Sayn. Otto played no part in imperial politics, he only was a few times at the imperial court, where he obtained 320 guilders annually for himself from the taxes of the city of Wetzlar in 1347.

In his last feud, against the brothers Gottfried and Wilderich III , Otto was killed in a battle, that, according to charters, must have taken place between 6 December 1350 and 25 January 1351. Otto was succeeded by his son John I, who stood under regency of his mother until 1362.

Marriage and issue
Otto married (marriage contract 23 December 1331) to Countess Adelaide of Vianden (d. 30 September 1376), daughter of Count Philip II of Vianden and Countess Adelaide of Arnsberg.

Otto and Adelaide were related. Otto’s great-grandmother, Countess Matilda of Guelders and Zutphen, was a younger sister of Count Gerard III of Guelders and Zutphen, a great-great-grandfather of Adelaide.

From the marriage of Otto and Adelaide the following children were born:
 Count John I ( – Herborn Castle, 4 September 1416), succeeded his father as Count of Nassau-Siegen. He married on 30 November 1357 to Countess  (d. 29 September 1409).
 Henry ‘the Swashbuckler’ (d. Kassel, 5 September 1402), was canon at the Cologne Cathedral since 1356.
 Otto (d. 1384), was canon and provost of Saint Maurice Church in Mainz since 1357 and canon of the Cologne Cathedral and the Mainz Cathedral since 1380.

Otto and Adelaide signed a marriage contract with Count Adolf II of the Mark and Countess Margaret of Cleves, for a son of Nassau to marry a daughter of the Mark, on 14 August 1343.

The second son, Henry ‘the Swashbuckler’, although being a clergyman, was nevertheless a brutal fighter of his time, as the disconcerting epithet that his comrades gave him reveals. He even sometimes attacked his eldest brother John.

Ancestors

Notes

References

Sources
 
 
 
 
 
 
 
  (1882). Het vorstenhuis Oranje-Nassau. Van de vroegste tijden tot heden (in Dutch). Leiden: A.W. Sijthoff/Utrecht: J.L. Beijers.

External links

 Nassau. In: Medieval Lands. A prosopography of medieval European noble and royal families, by Charles Cawley.
 Nassau Part 4. In: An Online Gotha, by Paul Theroff.

|-

Nassau-Siegen, Otto 02
Nassau-Siegen, Otto 02
Counts of Nassau
House of Nassau-Siegen
14th-century German nobility
Year of birth uncertain
Year of death uncertain